Hippeastrum striatum, the striped Barbados lily, a flowering perennial herbaceous bulbous plant, in the family Amaryllidaceae, native to the southern and eastern regions of Brazil.

Description
The flowers, generally 2–4, are smaller than other members of the genus. The paraperigon features bristles at the throat of the tepal tube. The perigone is about 7.6–10 cm in size and the tepal segments are 2–2.5 cm broad in their middle. Their colour is a bright red with a green keel that extends halfway up the segment. The stigma is trifid.

Taxonomy
Described in 1963 in Baileya. the name is derived from the Latin word striatus (striped). It is similar to H. petiolatum and H. puniceum.

Earlier synonyms have included species of Callicore and Lais, now considered to be Hippeastrum, as well as species of Amaryllis, from which Hippeastrum was separated.

Distribution
Brazil, 
Tanzania

Ecology
Produces numerous bulbils that facilitate its escape and naturalisation in tropical areas. It will grow from seeds in about two years.

References

Bibliography

 
 
 
 
 
 
 Forzza, R. C. et al. 2010. 2010 Lista de espécies Flora do Brasil. 

striatum
Flora of Brazil
Garden plants of South America